The 1933 Star Riders' Championship was decided on a knockout basis over nine heats.

Final 
14 September 1933
 Wembley, England

Heat Details
Heat 1 : Wotton, Case, Huxley, Croombs
Heat 2 : Farndon, Moore, Varey, Parker
Heat 3 : Blain, Whitfield, Bishop, Sharp
Heat 4 : Wilkinson, Langton, Chapman, Greatrex
Heat 5 : Johnson, Jackson, Goulden, Watson

Semi-final 1 : Farndon, Wotton, Whitfield
Semi-final 2 : Wilkinson, Jackson
Semi-final 3 : Johnson, Bishop, Moore

Final : Farndon, Johnson, Wilkinson

References

See also 

1933
Speedway
1933 in speedway